Freienorla is located in the German state of Thuringia. Although quite small and obscure, the municipality is known locally for its Gothic church as well as its lower mill, a watermill facility thought to be built in the tenth century. The Orlabahn railroad has a station located in Freienorla. Neighboring towns include Jena and Eisenberg. Freienorla is located 145 miles from the capital of Berlin.

References

External links
 

Municipalities in Thuringia
Saale-Holzland-Kreis